In the afternoon of 16 August 2019, a Palestinian driver hit two Israelis, outside the Gush Etzion settlement of Elazar. An off duty policeman saw the attack and shot the assailant who later died in the hospital.

Attack
The perpetrator was speeding  on Route 60 which connects the West Bank and Gush Etzion. He swerved off the road near a bus station outside the settlement of Elazar and rammed his car into two people, crashing over the guard railing.

A Hebron police officer who was on his way home after completing a shift noticed the attack and shot the driver as he was getting out of the vehicle. He also recorded the terror attack on his dashcam.

Victims
The victims, identified as Nahum and Noam Nevis, were both from Elazar.

Perpetrator
The Palestinian driver, Ala' Khader al-Hreimi, 26, from Bethlehem, had spent time in prison between 2014 and 2015 for unspecified violent activities. He later died of gunshot wounds in hospital.

References

August 2019 crimes in Asia
2019 crimes in Israel
Transport disasters in Israel
Transport disasters in 2019
Vehicular rampage in Israel
Attacks in Asia in 2019
History of Gush Etzion